Kai Bisgaard Anker Møller (22 May 1859 – 22 September 1940) was a Norwegian land owner and politician.

Biography
Møller was born at Dyrendal near Halden in Østfold, Norway.  He was the son of Edvard Johannes Møller (1819–85) and Diderikke Annette Anker (1838-1912). The family moved to Thorsø Manor (Thorsø herregård) at Torsnes when his father took over the estate. He attended Christiania Cathedral School and graduated in 1877. He graduated from the College of Agriculture (Høiere landbruksskole) (now Norwegian University of Life Sciences) at Ås in Akershus during 1880. This was followed by studies in Denmark and the United Kingdom. In 1885 he took over the Thorsø estate.

He served as mayor of Torsnes for several years and held a number of other municipal positions.  He was elected to the Parliament of Norway from 1900 to 1903, representing Smaalenenes amt (now Østfold). He was a member of the Liberal Party.

In 1889, he married his cousin Katti Anker Møller. daughter of Herman Anker (1839–1896). They were the parents of physician Tove Mohr.

References

Related reading
 Odd Grande (1961) Kai Møller, herren til Thorsø (Oslo: Gyldendal) 
 Tove Mohr (1976) Katti Anker Møller: en banebryter (Oslo. Tiden Norsk Forlag) 

1859 births
1940 deaths
People from Halden
People educated at Oslo Cathedral School
Norwegian College of Agriculture alumni
Members of the Storting
Liberal Party (Norway) politicians